Robert A. Weiss is an American dermatologist and current president of the American Society for Laser Medicine and Surgery.

Education
Weiss earned his bachelor's degree from Columbia University, after which he obtained his MD from Johns Hopkins University School of Medicine, class of 1978. He did his residency in dermatology at Johns Hopkins, then went on to additional fellowship training in dermatologic research at the National Institutes of Health. Weiss is board certified by the American Board of Dermatology.

Career
Weiss is the director and co-founder of Maryland Laser Skin and Vein in Baltimore, MD. He is a former associate professor of dermatology at Johns Hopkins University, and is currently a clinical associate professor of dermatology at University of Maryland School of Medicine. He has served as treasurer and president of the American Society of Dermatologic Surgery and past president of the American College of Phlebology. He is the current president of the American Society for Laser Medicine and Surgery. In addition, he has served on the Board of Directors for the International Society for Dermatologic Surgery. He is affiliated with the University of Maryland Medical Center.

Weiss has appeared on television shows such as 20/20, The Today Show, and local Baltimore news speaking about dermatologic matters. He has been quoted in Harper's Bazaar, The New York Times, The Baltimore Sun, and other publications. Since 1993, he has served as an associate or contributing editor for the Journal of Dermatologic Surgery. He has also published articles to peer-reviewed journals, as well as authoring medical textbooks, and holds multiple US patents.

Publications

Textbooks
Weiss RA, Feied C, and Weiss MA. Vein Diagnosis and Treatment: A Comprehensive Approach, McGraw-Hill Inc, New York, NY, 2001. Hardcover, 1st ed, 350pp 
Rigel DS, Weiss RA, Lim HW, Dover JS. Photoaging (Basic and Clinical Dermatology) CRC Press, 2004. Hardcover 1st ed, 416 pp 
Weiss RA, Goldman MP. Advanced Techniques in Dermatologic Surgery, Elsevier, Hardcover, 398pp 
Weiss RA, GuexJJ, Goldman M. Sclerotherapy Expert Consult: Treatment of Varicose and Telangiectatic Leg Veins, Saunders, 2011, Text with DVD, Online and Print, 5th ed, 416pp 
Weiss RA, Weiss MA, Beasley KL. Sclerotherapy and Vein Treatment. McGraw-Hill Inc, New York, NY, 2012. Hardcover, 2nd ed, 230pp 
Goldman MP, Fitzpatrick RE, Ross VE, Kilmer SL, Weiss RA. Lasers and Energy Devices for the Skin, CRC Press, 2013. Hardcover 2nd ed, 400pp

Patents

 With Mitchel P. Goldman, Robert A. Weiss, Arthur W. Zikorus, James G. Chandler
 With Mitchel P. Goldman, Robert A. Weiss, Arthur W. Zikorus, James G. Chandler
 With Mitchel P. Goldman, Robert A. Weiss, Eric B. Taylor, Don Johnson, Ignacio Cespedes
 With David R. Hennings, Mitchel P. Goldman, Robert A. Weiss, Eric B. Taylor, Don Johnson, Ignacio Cespedes
 With David R. Hennings, Mitchel P. Goldman, Robert A. Weiss, Eric B Taylor, Don Johnson

References

External links

Year of birth missing (living people)
Living people
American dermatologists
Columbia University alumni
Johns Hopkins School of Medicine alumni
Johns Hopkins University faculty
University of Maryland School of Medicine faculty
Fellows of the American Physical Society